FC Chernomorets 1919 is a Bulgarian football club from the city of Burgas, which currently competes in Bulgaria's 3rd football league, the Third League. Chernomorets plays its home matches at the local Stadion Chernomorets.

The club was founded in 2015, following the financial struggles of the former Burgas-based team, Chernomorets Burgas. Although the new club in considered a separate entity from the previous team, fans consider it to be a legitimate successor, which is supported by the public, unlike the previous club.

History

Foundation
Following the relegate to V group of PSFC Chernomorets Burgas and the discoveries that Mitko Sabev drained the club, association "Future for Chernomorets Burgas" wanted a new team to represent the original team FC Chernomorets Burgas who was dissolved in 2006. On 4 August 2015 they officially founded Chernomorets 1919. Zlatko Yankov, who played on 2 world cups with Bulgaria and Stoyko Sakaliev returned to football and were the first players to join the team. In 2018, the team entered the Third Amateur Football League for the first time. In their first season in the third tier, Chernomorets finished 4th.

Shirt and sponsors
Chernomorets 1919 main colors are blue and white.

Players

Managers

League positions

Past seasons

References

External links
Official website
Official Facebook
bgclubs.eu

Chernomorets 1919
Association football clubs established in 2015
2015 establishments in Bulgaria